Marek Forgáč (born 21 January 1974 in Košice) is Slovak bishop who has been the titular bishop of Seleuciana and the auxiliary bishop of Archdiocese of Košice since 2016. In years 2011  2016, he served as Pro Dean of the Faculty of Theology of the Catholic University in Košice.

Priesthood 
Marek Forgáč has been a priest since his was ordinated by Mons. Alojz Tkáč, archbishop of Košice, on 19 June 1999. He was serving in the parish of Trebišov (1999  2000), the parish of Snina (2000  2001) and the parish of Humenné (2001  2002). Then, in years 2002  2004, he was chaplain in the University Pastoral Centre of St Martyrs of Košice in Košice.

In the following years, he was studying for a Licentiate at Institute of psychology of Pontifical Gregorian University in Rome. After the studies, he returned to the University Pastoral Centre of St Martyrs of Košice in Košice as its spiritual administrator. He stayed at this post from 2007 to 2016.

He absolved his doctoral studies at the Faculty of Arts of the University of Trnava in the department of social psychology in years 2008  2012. In years 2011  2016, he served as Pro Dean of the Faculty of Theology of the Catholic University in Košice.

He habilitated as docent at the Faculty of Theology of the Catholic University in Košice in year 2015.

He lectures pastoral and general psychology and clinical, general and applicated psychology of matrimony and family.

Bishop 
On 11 June 2016, Pope Francis appointed him as the auxiliary bishop of Archdiocese of Košice and the titular bishop of Seleuciana. His bishop consecration took place in the St Elisabeth Cathedral in Košice on 1 September 2016. Marek Forgáč was ordinated by Bernard Bober, archbishop of Košice, cardinal Jozef Tomko, Prefect emeritus of the Congregation for the Evangelization of Peoples, and Mario Giordana, Apostolic Nuncio in Slovakia.

References

External links

1974 births
Living people
Clergy from Košice
21st-century Roman Catholic bishops in Slovakia